Gerald McKenny is an American theologian, currently the Walter Professor at University of Notre Dame.

Education
B.A., Wheaton College (Illinois) 1979
M.Div., Princeton Theological Seminary, 1982
Ph.D., University of Chicago, 1989

References

Year of birth missing (living people)
Living people
University of Notre Dame faculty
American theologians
Wheaton College (Illinois) alumni
Princeton Theological Seminary alumni
University of Chicago alumni